Smallwood is a civil parish in Cheshire East, England.  It contains nine buildings that are recorded in the National Heritage List for England as designated listed buildings, all of which are listed at Grade II.  This grade is the lowest of the three gradings given to listed buildings and is applied to "buildings of national importance and special interest".  Apart from the village of Smallwood, the parish is rural.  The listed buildings consist of farmhouses, farm buildings, a house, a school, a former Women's Land Army hostel, and a church.

References

Citations

Sources

 

Listed buildings in the Borough of Cheshire East
Lists of listed buildings in Cheshire